Lorenzo Tiepolo (died August 15, 1275) was Doge of Venice from 1268 until his death.

Biography
Born in Venice, Lorenzo Tiepolo was the son of Doge Jacopo Tiepolo.

Tiepolo demonstrated skill as commander when, during the War of Saint Sabas with Genoa, he defeated the Genoese at the Battle of Acre in 1258. He served also as a podestà of Fano.

In 1262, he took part in the peace negotiation between Venice and prince William of Villehardouin, whose vassal he was for the islands of Skopelos and Skyros, in the aftermath of the War of the Euboeote Succession.

In 1268, after the death of Reniero Zeno, Lorenzo was elected as Doge on July 23 of that year, with 25 votes out of 41. Although beloved by the population, he attracted the hostility of the Venetian nobility for his nepotism towards his sons. The position of Cancellier Grande ("Great Chancellor") was therefore created to thwart such a behaviour.

In 1270, a peace treaty was signed with Genoa at Cremona, confirming the Venetian predominance in the Adriatic Sea; however, in that same year a war broke out between Venice and a league of Italian cities including Bologna, Treviso, Verona, Mantua, Ferrara, Cremona, Recanati, and Ancona due to commercial disputes. After an initial setback in 1271, the Venetians were able to regain the upper hand and the terms of peace were favourable to Venice.

Under his dogado, in 1273, Marco Polo began his journey to China. He did not return until 1295.

Tiepolo died in Venice in 1275 and was buried with his father in the Dominican church of San Zanipolo.

Family 
His first wife was, according to conflicting traditions, "either the daughter of the King of Romania or of Bohemund of Brienne, ruler of Rascia". Probably widowed, he married before 1262 his second wife, Marchesina Ghisi, daughter of Geremia Ghisi.

He had two sons from his second marriage, Giacomo and Pietro.

References

1275 deaths
13th-century Doges of Venice
Year of birth unknown
War of Saint Sabas
Burials at Santi Giovanni e Paolo, Venice